Bergame is one of 54 parishes in Cangas del Narcea, a municipality within the province and autonomous community of Asturias, in northern Spain.

Villages
Bergame d'Abaxu
Bergame d'Arriba
El Cabaḷḷeitu
Tremáu del Coutu
Viḷḷar de Bergame

References

Parishes in Cangas del Narcea